The Secret of the Old Mill is Volume 3 in the original The Hardy Boys Mystery Stories published by Grosset & Dunlap. The book ranks 86th on Publishers Weekly's All-Time Bestselling Children's Book List for the United States, with 1,467,645 copies sold by 2001. This book is one of the "Original 10", some of the best examples of the Hardy Boys, and Stratemeyer Syndicate, writing.

This book was written for the Stratemeyer Syndicate by Leslie McFarlane in 1927. On January 1, 2023, the 1927 version entered into the US Public Domain, due to 2022 having been the book’s 95th year.  However, the 1927 version is still under copyright in Canada until January 1, 2048, due to Canada using the author’s life plus 70 years model for works-for-hire.  As Leslie McFarlane died in 1977, the last year for Canadian copyright on the 1927 version will be 2047.  The 1962 version will enter the US Public Domain on January 1, 2058, and the Canadian Public Domain as late as January 1, 2067 (Alistair Hunter possibly died in 1996). Between 1959 and 1973 the first 38 volumes of this series were systematically revised as part of a project directed by Harriet Adams, Edward Stratemeyer's daughter. The original version of this book was rewritten in 1962 by Alistair Hunter resulting in two different stories with the same title.

Plot summary (Revised Edition) 

Frank and Joe help prevent 14-year-old cyclist Ken Blake from getting killed in an accident.  As they help the boy up they see he is delivering an envelope to Victor Peters, a name that means something to the Hardys later on in the book.

The Hardys learn that their friend Chet Morton has been tricked when asked to make change for what turned out to be a counterfeit twenty dollar bill, something that the police later confirm is becoming more common in their town of Bayport.

Later, Joe is awakened by a clattering sound and sees a mysterious figure bicycling away from the Hardys' home.  While investigating the disturbance a note is found that reads, "Drop case or else danger for you and your family."  The Hardy boys are not sure if this threat refers to the counterfeiting case that Frank and Joe are investigating or another case their detective dad, Fenton Hardy, is trying to solve.

The Hardys go with Chet, who wants to apply for a job at Elekton Controls, a missile-development company, but are told by Mr. Markel, one of Elekton's security guards, that there are no openings.  Before leaving, they notice a bike that looks similar to the one ridden by Ken Blake and that is likely to have been used by the person who left the threatening note.  Mr. Docker, an Elekton maintenance man, tells them that Ken does odd jobs for the company, but that he is not there at that time, even though Joe is certain he saw Ken looking out an adjacent old watermill's window at them.  The Hardys, their girlfriends, Iola Morton and Callie Shaw and Chet go nearby to have a picnic but an arrow is shot at them with an attached note reading, "Danger.  Hardys beware."

The Hardy brothers receive a gift of a motorboat they call The Sleuth, and show it to their friend, Tony Prito.  Tony says the construction supply yard he is working at for the summer has become the latest to receive counterfeit money used to pay for lumber by a boy matching the description of Ken Blake.  The Hardys take The Sleuth to the mill to investigate and find the mill wheel starting and stopping.  Soon, they are attacked and left without gas in their new boat.  They recover and get back to investigating by finding Ken who says he thinks someone has used his bike the same night that Joe saw someone bicycling from the Hardy's home.  Markel and Docker pull Ken away and then a suspicious vehicle leaves Elekton.  Later, the same suspicious vehicle gets away before an explosion at Elekton.  Frank and Joe are terrified that their dad is inside the burning building.  He was in the building but survived the explosion revealing that he was there to stop the attack after realizing there is a pattern to similar type attacks going on around similar companies in the United States.

Eager to learn more from Ken, the Hardys soon find that Ken has been released from Elekton.  The Hardys find him at a boarding house and he explains that the bricks and lumber bought with the counterfeit money were being used for a project at the mill.  Frank and Joe return to the old mill and realize that the wheel mill is set up to act as a signaling device for the people living inside; an electric-eye stops the flow of electricity to the wheel. It acts as a warning to those inside that someone is approaching the mill.  Going inside the mill at a time when they know no one else is there, they discover a secret room hidden by the lumber bought with counterfeit money. In the secret room, they find the tools used to make the fake money, but before they can get away the villains return to the mill.  Frank and Joe escape through a tunnel but are captured by Docker and Markel.

Victor Peters arrives and these three villains reveal that Docker shot the arrow at the girlfriends and Markel used the bike to deliver the note to the Hardys' home. Docker and Markel also explain that, without the knowledge of Victor Peters, they allowed another villain, Paul Blum, into Elekton to attack the place, which is the case that Fenton Hardy was investigating. Blum reveals that he is working for other countries who wish to stop United States missile development. Frank and Joe take advantage of an opportunity and overtake the villains. The book ends with the police arresting all the villains and the expectation of the Hardys' next case when "they were called upon to solve the mystery of The Missing Chums."

References

External links
 Full text of The Secret of the Old Mill at HathiTrust Digital Library
 

The Hardy Boys books
1927 American novels
1927 children's books
1962 American novels
1962 children's books
Grosset & Dunlap books